The Granite City YMCA is a historic YMCA building located at 2001 Edison Avenue in Granite City, Illinois. The building was built in 1924–26 for Granite City's branch of the YMCA, which was founded in 1916. St. Louis, Missouri-based architects Wedemeyer and Nelson designed the Late Gothic Revival style building; their design features a red brick and green tile exterior punctuated by vertical shafts and topped by a parapet. The building is the only institutional building in Granite City designed in the Gothic Revival style. The YMCA used the building for their activities, which included athletics, community education and citizenship classes, community gatherings, and charity work. The building closed in 2004 when the YMCA moved elsewhere.

The building was added to the National Register of Historic Places on September 5, 2017.

References

National Register of Historic Places in Madison County, Illinois
YMCA buildings in the United States
Clubhouses on the National Register of Historic Places in Illinois
Gothic Revival architecture in Illinois
Granite City, Illinois
1926 establishments in Illinois
Buildings and structures completed in 1926